is a city located in Kanagawa Prefecture, Japan. , the city had an estimated population of 223,960 and a population density of 2400 persons per km².
While the name "Atsugi" is often associated with the United States Navy base named Naval Air Facility Atsugi, the base is actually not in Atsugi, but straddles the border between the nearby cities of Ayase and Yamato.

Geography
It is located at the northern end of the Sagami Plain created by the Sagami River, which originates from Lake Yamanaka, and straddles the Tanzawa Mountains in the west and the plain on the west bank of the Sagami River to the southeast. The Nakatsu River and Koayu River, which originate from the Higashitanzawa Mountains, join the Sagami River, which forms the border with Ebina, Zama, and Sagamihara. Parts of the western portion of the city are within the Tanzawa-Ōyama Quasi-National Park and include Mount Ōyama.

Surrounding municipalities
Kanagawa Prefecture
Isehara
Ebina
Sagamihara
Zama
Hadano
Hiratsuka
Aikawa
Samukawa
Kiyokawa

Climate
Atsugi has a humid subtropical climate (Köppen Cfa) characterized by warm summers and cool winters with light to no snowfall.  The average annual temperature in Atsugi is 13.4 °C. The average annual rainfall is 1906 mm with September as the wettest month. The temperatures are highest on average in August, at around 24.5 °C, and lowest in January, at around 2.3 °C.

Demographics
Per Japanese census data, the population of Atsugi has grown steadily over the past century.

History
The area around present-day Atsugi city has been inhabited for thousands of years. Archaeologists have found ceramic shards from the Jōmon period at numerous locations in the area.  By the Kamakura period, this area part of the Mōri shōen, part of the holdings of Ōe no Hiromoto. His descendants, the Mōri clan later ruled Chōshū domain. During the Kamakura period, the area was also known for its foundry industry for the production of bells for Buddhist temples. The area came under the control of the Ashikaga clan in the early Muromachi period and was later part of the territories of the Later Hōjō clan from Odawara. With the start of the Edo period, the area was tenryō territory controlled directly by the Tokugawa shogunate, but administered through various hatamoto, as well as exclaves under the control of Odawara Domain, Sakura Domain, Mutsuura Domain, Ogino-Yamanaka Domain and Karasuyama Domain. After the Meiji Restoration, the area was consolidated into Aikō District of Kanagawa Prefecture by 1876. Atsugi town was created on April 1, 1889, through merger of several small hamlets, with the establishment of the modern municipalities system. Atsugi was elevated to city status on February 1, 1955, through merger with neighboring Mutsuai Village, Koaiyu Village, Tamagawa Village and Minamimori Village. The city expanded on July 8, 1958, through merger with neighboring Echi Village, and with Aikawa Village from Naka District. On September 30, 1956, Ogino Village joined with Atsugi.  In April 2000, Atsugi exceeded 200,000 in population and was proclaimed a special city with increased autonomy from the central government.

Government
Atsugi has a mayor-council form of government with a directly elected mayor and a unicameral city council of 28 members. Atsugi contributes three members to the Kanagawa Prefectural Assembly. In terms of national politics, the city is part of Kanagawa 16th district of the lower house of the Diet of Japan.

Economy
Atsugi is mainly known as a bedroom community for the Tokyo-Yokohama metropolitan area. Nissan has operated a design center in Atsugi, Japan, since 1982.
Sony operates the Atsugi Technology Center and the Atsugi Technology Center No. 2 in Atsugi.
Anritsu is headquartered in Atsugi, as well as some of the NTT Research and Development labs.

Education
Atsugi has 23 public elementary schools and 13 public middle schools operated by the city government. The city has six public high schools operated by the Kanagawa Prefectural Board of Education. There are also one private elementary school and two private high schools. Shoin University and the Kanagawa Institute of Technology are based in Atsugi, and the Tokyo Polytechnic University and the Tokyo University of Agriculture has campuses in the city

Transportation

Railroad
 Odakyu Electric Railway – Odakyū Odawara Line
  -

Highway
 
 , to Tokyo or Nagoya
 , to Hiratsuka or Sagamihara
 , to central Tokyo or Numazu
 , to Odawara (toll)
 , to Sagamiko

Sister City relations
 – Yokote, Akita, Japan, from May 24, 1985
 – Abashiri, Hokkaidō, Japan from February 5, 2005
 – New Britain, Connecticut, United States from May 31, 1983
 – Yangzhou. Jiangsu, China from October 23, 1984
 – Gunpo, Gyeonggi-do, Republic of Korea from February 5, 2005

Local attractions
Iiyama Kannon (Chokokuji temple)
 Iiyama Onsen
 Nanasawa Onsen
 Nanasawa Forest Park
Mount Ōyama

Notable people from Atsugi
Akira Amari, politician
Kyōko Koizumi, actress, singer
Azusa Senou, singer
Nobuteru Maeda, vocalist
Yurina Kumai, singer
Tatsunori Hara, former baseball player, manager of Yomiuri Giants
Hitoshi Tamura,  baseball player
Teruyuki Moniwa, football player
Genki Nagasato, football player
Miki Igarashi, guitarist of band Show-Ya
Emi Nakamura, singer, songwriter
Kiyoe Yoshioka, Singer of the band Ikimonogakari
Yuki Nagasato, football player
Madoka Sugai, ballet dancer

References

External links

Official Website 

Cities in Kanagawa Prefecture